Jungle rot may refer to:

In medicine
Tropical ulcer (also known as "Jungle rot", and "Aden ulcer", "Malabar ulcer", and "Tropical phagedena")

In media
Jungle Rot (band)